Hazel Run may refer to:

Hazel Run, Minnesota, a city
Hazel Run, Missouri, an unincorporated community
Hazel Run (Terre Bleue Creek), a stream in Missouri